Trigonopterus amphoralis is a species of flightless weevil in the genus Trigonopterus from Indonesia.

Description
The species body is elongated, measuring 3.02mm in length.  General coloration is black, with rust-colored legs and antennae.

Range
T. amphoralis is found in the Bukit Barisan Selatan National Park and around Pedada Bay in Lampung, Sumatra.

References

amphoralis
Beetles described in 1925
Beetles of Asia
Taxa named by Guy Anstruther Knox Marshall